Stanley M. Powell was a Republican member of the Michigan House of Representatives and a delegate to the Michigan constitutional convention of 1962.

Born on July 7, 1898 to Herbert and Alice Powell in Ionia, Stanley was a lifelong farmer in Ionia County. Powell served one term in the House (1931-1932) but was defeated for re-election in 1932. Three decades later, Powell was a delegate to the constitutional convention which drafted the Michigan Constitution. Shortly after the convention, Powell was again elected to the House and served 14 years.

Powell was a member of the Farm Bureau (particularly as legislative counsel and public affairs director), Grange, the American Legion, as well as Pi Kappa Delta, Delta Sigma Rho, and Alpha Zeta. Powell was also president of the Michigan Good Roads Federation. He was a founder of the highway Users Conference and president of the Michigan Good Roads Federation in 1957.

Powell died on August 25, 1988, aged 90.

References

1898 births
1988 deaths
People from Ionia, Michigan
Farmers from Michigan
Republican Party members of the Michigan House of Representatives
20th-century American politicians